Cham Lameh-ye Osman (also Romanized as Cham Lameh-ye ʿOs̱mān) is a village in Dasht-e Hor Rural District, in the Central District of Salas-e Babajani County, Kermanshah Province, Iran. At the 2006 census, its population was 214, in 40 families.

References 

Populated places in Salas-e Babajani County